That One Night: Live in Buenos Aires is a live album from American heavy metal band Megadeth which was released on CD and DVD formats. It features a live concert recorded in Buenos Aires on October 9, 2005 at the Obras Sanitarias Stadium. The performance is segued by cuts of Dave and Glen performing a few acoustic songs for some fans on the lawn outside of the band's hotel. It was at this concert that Dave Mustaine announced that Megadeth would continue on past the 2005 tour.

There are also four currently unreleased songs from the performance, missing from either the CD or DVD version: ("The Scorpion", "Train of Consequences", "Of Mice and Men" and "Sweating Bullets"). The 2 CD version was released on September 4, 2007. It was originally intended to be released at the same time as the DVD. The DVD was certified gold in the US & Argentina, it went platinum in Canada. units and was voted Best DVD in the 2007 Burrn! magazine Reader's Poll. This is the only release by Megadeth to feature bassist James MacDonough. He did not record with the band on any studio albums and departed from the band in 2006 and was replaced by bassist James LoMenzo before production on the following studio album United Abominations (2007) began.

Reception

Allmusic's Greg Prato rated the album at four stars and called That One Night "further hard proof" that Megadeth is "one of the most precise and tight thrash bands".

About.com's Chad Bowar also rated the album at four stars and stated "everything came together well for this release. The crowd is outstanding, even singing along to guitar riffs, and the band is in great form. The audio quality is excellent, and captures enough crowd noise without being distracting. Megadeth is one of the great thrash bands of all time, and this live CD is a good representation of their repertoire".

PopMatters's Andrew Blackie wrote in his page and praised That One Night as a work superbly filmed, focusing on both capturing the facial expressions of the band members in mid-solo and the flashing light show, and the reaction of the bordering on over-enthusiastic crowd, who seem to know every word of every song, juxtaposing this with occasional footage of an incognito acoustic performance for fans earlier in the day. Blackie gave the album 8/10.

Track listing

CD
All music and lyrics by Dave Mustaine, except where noted

DVD
"Blackmail the Universe"
"Set the World Afire"
"Wake Up Dead"
"In My Darkest Hour"
"She-Wolf"
"Reckoning Day"
"A Tout le Monde"
"Hangar 18
"Return to Hangar"
"I'll Be There"
"Tornado of Souls"
"Trust"
"Something That I'm Not"
"Kick the Chair"
"Coming Home"
"Symphony of Destruction"
"Peace Sells"
"Holy Wars... The Punishment Due"
"Silent Scorn (tape)"

Bonus feature
"Symphony of Destruction (Alternate Track)"

Unreleased songs from the performance
"The Scorpion"
"Train of Consequences"
"Of Mice and Men"
"Sweating Bullets"

Personnel
Dave Mustaine – guitars, lead vocals
Glen Drover – guitars, backing vocals
James MacDonough – bass, backing vocals
Shawn Drover – drums

Production credits
Michael Sarna – director, producer
Shalini Waran – producer
Dave Mustaine– audio production
Jeff Balding – audio production, mixing
Dean Gonzalez – editor
Michael Palmero – editor
Gary Haber – executive producer
John Dee – executive producer
Kevin Gasser – executive producer

Charts

Certifications

References

Megadeth video albums
2007 live albums
Live video albums
2007 video albums
Megadeth live albums
Live thrash metal albums
Live albums recorded in Buenos Aires